MondoHomo Dirty South is an alternative queer music & arts festival that debuted in Atlanta in June 2007, during the first U.S. Social Forum. The first MondoHomo was created by Kiki Carr and Nikki Chotas, and inspired by Olympia, Washington's Homo-a-Gogo Festival.

MondoHomo Dirty South 2008 took place over Memorial Day weekend in Atlanta. It is the biggest showcase of HomoHop in the South, and one of the significant showcases in the U.S., along with Oakland's PeaceOut festival.

In addition to HomoHop, MondoHomo features queer punk, rock, DJs, spoken word, drag, burlesque, games and workshops. MondoHomo is dedicated to queer radical politics in the South, and towards that end, emphasizes DIY politics and culture.

References

External links 
 Home Page

LGBT events in Georgia (U.S. state)
LGBT music festivals
Music festivals established in 2007
Music festivals in Georgia (U.S. state)